Alexandre Vladimirovich Boikov (born February 7, 1975) is a retired Russian professional ice hockey defenceman. He most recently played for Dynamo Moscow of the Kontinental Hockey League (KHL).

Playing career
Undrafted, and after playing for three different teams in the Western Hockey League, the Boikov was signed by the San Jose Sharks on April 22, 1996. However, it was not until signing with the Nashville Predators that he would make his National Hockey League (NHL) debut. Boikov played a total of 10 NHL games over short stints in the 1999–2000 and 2000–01 seasons.

Boikov returned to Russia in 2002 to play the next four seasons for Metallurg Magnitogorsk in the Russian Super League.

Career statistics

Regular season and playoffs

International

References

External links
 

1975 births
Metallurg Magnitogorsk players
HC MVD players
HC Dynamo Moscow players
Kentucky Thoroughblades players
Living people
Milwaukee Admirals (IHL) players
Milwaukee Admirals players
Nashville Predators players
Sportspeople from Chelyabinsk
Prince George Cougars players
Rochester Americans players
Russian ice hockey defencemen
Salavat Yulaev Ufa players
Torpedo Nizhny Novgorod players
Tri-City Americans players
Undrafted National Hockey League players
Victoria Cougars (WHL) players